was a Japanese photographer.

References

Japanese photographers
1903 births
1984 deaths